The JW Marriott San Francisco Union Square is a luxury hotel in San Francisco, California. It is owned by Park Hotels & Resorts.

History
The hotel was designed and built by architect and developer John Portman, and opened in 1987 as The Portman. It was sold on June 1, 1990 to Pan Pacific Hotels, a division of the Tokyu Corporation, which renamed it The Pan Pacific Hotel San Francisco. On August 10, 2003, Tokyu sold the hotel to San Francisco-based Oxford Lodging for $45 million. Pan Pacific was retained to manage the hotel. On February 23, 2006, Oxford sold the hotel to Ashford Hospitality Trust, for $95 million. On April 19, 2006, Ashford announced that they had concluded a management deal with Marriott International, and the hotel was placed in their JW Marriott brand and renamed JW Marriott San Francisco Union Square.

In 2011, Ashford sold the hotel to Thayer Lodging for $96 million. Thayer then sold the property to Chesapeake Lodging Trust in 2014 for $147 million. Chesapeake was acquired by Park Hotels & Resorts in 2019.

References

Further reading

External links
 JW Marriott San Francisco Union Square official website

Hotel buildings completed in 1987
Hotels established in 1987
John C. Portman Jr. buildings
JW Marriott Hotels
Skyscraper hotels in San Francisco